Catalán is a surname. Notable people with the surname include:
Alex Catalán (1968), Spanish director of photography
Alfredo Catalán (1968), Venezuelan politician
Andrés Catalán (2000), Mexican professional footballer
Diego Catalán (1928–2008), Spanish philologist
Matías Catalán (1992), Argentine-born Chilean footballer
Miguel A. Catalán (1894–1957), Spanish spectroscopist
Zaida Catalán ( 1980–2017), Swedish politician

Ethnonymic surnames
Spanish-language surnames